Abbasi  may refer to:

 Abbasi (currency), gold and silver coins issued by Abbas I of Persia
 Abbasi (surname), a Muslim surname, including a list of people with the name
 Abbasi Program in Islamic Studies, a center for Islamic studies at Stanford University
 Dhund (tribe) or Dhund Abbasi, a tribe of northern Pakistan

Places
Abbasi, Bushehr, a village in Ganaveh County, Bushehr Province, Iran
Abbasi, Khuzestan, a village in Ahvaz County, Khuzestan Province, Iran
Abbasi, Aligudarz, a village in Aligudarz County, Lorestan Province, Iran
Abbasi, Dowreh, a village in Dowreh County, Lorestan Province, Iran

See also
 Abasi (disambiguation)
 Abbasi (disambiguation)
 Abbassi, a given name and surname